Rodag or Rodak (Middle Persian: Rōdak, New Persian: رودک) was a 3rd-century Sasanian noblewoman, the wife of Pabag and the mother of Ardashir I, the founder of the Sasanian Empire. She is mentioned in the inscription of Shapur I on the wall of the Ka'ba-ye Zartosht at Naqsh-e Rostam near Persepolis in southern Iran as “Mother of the King of Kings”.

References

Sources 
 

3rd-century Iranian people
3rd-century deaths
Women from the Sasanian Empire
3rd-century women